Pride of Nations is a turn-based grand strategy video game set in the 19th century and 20th century (1850-1920) which allows players to play as one of the great powers (United Kingdom, United States, France, Prussia, Austria, Italy, Russia and Japan) to industrialize their nation, or expand their nation by military conquest and colonization.

Reception
Pride of Nations received mixed reviews from critics upon release. On Metacritic, the game holds a score of 70/100 based on 14 reviews.

References

External links
Pride of Nations 

2011 video games
Multiplayer and single-player video games
Turn-based strategy video games
Video games developed in France
Windows games
Windows-only games
Grand strategy video games